Rips may refer to:

Places
 Rips, Sarandë, location in Albania on the border with Greece
 De Rips, a village in the Netherlands

People
 Eliyahu Rips (born 1948), Israeli mathematician
 Lance Rips (born 1948), American psychologist
 Nicolaia Rips (born 1998), American author

Fictional characters
 Rip Van Winkle, a fictional person out of time from the eponymous story
 Rip Hunter, a fictional DC Comics superhero

Other uses
 Rips (album), 2014 debut studio album by American indie rock band Ex Hex
 RIPS (Re-Inforce Programming Security), a software static code analysis tool
 RIPS Technologies, the company that publishes RIPS

See also

 Rips complex, an abstract simplicial complex 
 Rips machine, an R-tree action group study method
 Rip (disambiguation)